Reading Football Club are an English football club, from Reading, Berkshire. Established in 1871, the club is one of the oldest teams in England, but did not join The Football League until 1920, and had never played in the top tier of English football league system before the 2006–07 season.

Winners

Wins by player

Wins by playing position

Wins by nationality

References

External links
Official website

 Player Of The Season
Association football player of the year awards by club in England
Association football player non-biographical articles